The 1967–68 Irish Cup was the 88th edition of the premier knock-out cup competition in Northern Irish football. 

Crusaders won the cup for the 2nd time and the 2nd consecutive year, defeating Linfield 2–0 in the final at The Oval.

Results

First round

|}

Quarter-finals

|}

Replay

|}

Second replay

|}

Semi-finals

|}

Replay

|}

Final

References

External links
The Rec.Sport.Soccer Statistics Foundation - Northern Ireland - Cup Finals
 Malcolm Brodie: Down Memory Lane: A veggie diet inspired 1968 Crusaders victory, Belfast Telegraph, 7 May 2011.

Irish Cup seasons
1967–68 in Northern Ireland association football
1967–68 domestic association football cups